The 1971 All-Ireland Under-21 Football Championship was the eighth staging of the All-Ireland Under-21 Football Championship since its establishment by the Gaelic Athletic Association in 1964.

Cork entered the championship as defending champions.

On 19 September 1971, Cork won the championship following a 3-10 to 0-3 defeat of Fermanagh in the All-Ireland final. This was their second All-Ireland title overall and their second in succession.

Results

All-Ireland Under-21 Football Championship

Semi-finals

Final

Statistics

Miscellaneous

 In the provincial championships there are a number of firsts as Fermanagh and Louth win the respective Ulster and Leinster titles for the first time in their history.
 The All-Ireland semi-final between Louth and Fermanagh remains their only championship meeting.

References

1971
All-Ireland Under-21 Football Championship